Washington Township is one of the eighteen townships of Columbiana County, Ohio, United States. The 2010 census reported 2,264 people living in the township, 953 of whom were in the unincorporated portions of the township.

Geography
Located in the southern part of the county, it borders the following townships:
Wayne Township - north
Madison Township - northeast
Yellow Creek Township - east
Brush Creek Township, Jefferson County - south
Fox Township, Carroll County - west
Franklin Township - northwest

One village is located in Washington Township:
The village of Salineville, in the west

Name and history

It is one of forty-three Washington Townships statewide.

The township was organized in 1816, and was originally known as Saline Township.

Government
The township is governed by a three-member board of trustees, who are elected in November of odd-numbered years to a four-year term beginning on the following January 1. Two are elected in the year after the presidential election and one is elected in the year before it. There is also an elected township fiscal officer, who serves a four-year term beginning on April 1 of the year after the election, which is held in November of the year before the presidential election. Vacancies in the fiscal officership or on the board of trustees are filled by the remaining trustees.

Township Trustees
Charles Jarvis, Chairman
James L. Sevek, Vice Chairman
Pete Sambroak, Jr.

Fiscal Officer
Tonya S. Sevek

References

External links
County website

Townships in Columbiana County, Ohio
Townships in Ohio
1816 establishments in Ohio
Populated places established in 1816